Oleksandr Ishchenko (born 3 September 1953) is a former football player and manager who is currently the head coach of the Dynamo football school.

He played for SKA Odessa and FC Zirka Kirovohrad, and he coached the Ukraine national under-21 football team, FC Karpaty Lviv and FC Illichivets Mariupol.

Honours

Player
 Cup of the Ukrainian SSR
 Winner (2): 1973, 1975 (both Zirka Kirovohrad)

Coach
 UEFA European Under-21 Championship
 Runner-up (1): 2006 (Ukraine)

External links 
 Profile at Sports.com.ua
 
 Profile at FC Dynamo Kyiv website

1953 births
Living people
People from Kremenchuk
Soviet footballers
Ukrainian footballers
FC Metalurh Zaporizhzhia players
SKA Odesa players
FC Zvezda Tiraspol players
FC Zirka Kropyvnytskyi players
FC Polissya Zhytomyr players
FC Papirnyk Malyn players
Soviet Second League players
Soviet Second League managers
Ukraine national under-21 football team managers
Soviet football managers
Ukrainian football managers
FC Oleksandriya managers
FC Papirnyk Malyn managers
FC Polissya Zhytomyr managers
FC Zirka Kropyvnytskyi managers
FC Nyva Vinnytsia managers
SC Tavriya Simferopol managers
FC Spartak Ivano-Frankivsk managers
FC Kryvbas Kryvyi Rih managers
FC Karpaty Lviv managers
FC Mariupol managers
FC Aktobe managers
Ukrainian Premier League managers
Ukrainian First League managers
Ukrainian Second League managers
Kazakhstan Premier League managers
Dynamo Kyiv Football Academy managers
Ukrainian expatriate football managers
Ukrainian expatriate sportspeople in Kazakhstan
Expatriate football managers in Kazakhstan
Association football defenders
Sportspeople from Poltava Oblast